Powersite Dam is a hydroelectric dam that went into service in 1913 in Forsyth, Missouri.

It is found along the White River, and the reservoir it forms is Lake Taneycomo. It was the first hydroelectric dam built in Missouri. Designed in 1911 by Nils F. Ambursen as the largest concrete buttress dam of its kind, the dam is still privately owned by the Empire District Electric Company.

Originally constructed to provide 4 megawatts of 25 hertz power, it has since been upgraded to provide 16 megawatts of 60 hertz power. Sixty hertz is now the standard frequency of electric power in North America, though the old 25 hertz power distribution was more efficient, having less losses.

References

Sources
 Van Buskirk, Kathleen, Powersite Dam, Program of June 10, 1984 Meeting, retrieved 2008-04-21

1913 establishments in Missouri
Buildings and structures in Taney County, Missouri
Dams completed in 1913
Dams in Missouri